
Gmina Dębnica Kaszubska is a rural gmina (administrative district) in Słupsk County, Pomeranian Voivodeship, in northern Poland.

The gmina contains part of the protected area called Słupia Valley Landscape Park.

Villages
Gmina Dębnica Kaszubska contains the villages and settlements of Boguszyce, Borzęcinko, Borzęcino, Brzeziniec, Budówko, Budowo, Dargacz, Dębnica Kaszubska, Dobieszewko, Dobieszewo, Dobra, Dobrzec, Dobrzykowo, Dudzicze, Gałęzów, Gogolewko, Gogolewo, Goszczyno, Grabin, Grabówko, Jamrzyno, Jawory, Konradowo, Kotowo, Krzynia, Krzywań, Łabiszewo, Łabiszewo-Kolonia, Leśnia, Łysomice, Łysomiczki, Maleniec, Mielno, Motarzyno, Niemczewo, Niepoględzie, Ochodza, Podole Małe, Podwilczyn, Skarszów Dolny, Skarszów Górny, Spole, Starnice, Starniczki, Suliszewo, Troszki and Żarkowo.

Neighbouring gminas
Gmina Dębnica Kaszubska is bordered by the gminas of Borzytuchom, Czarna Dąbrówka, Damnica, Kobylnica, Kołczygłowy, Potęgowo, Słupsk and Trzebielino.

References
Polish official population figures 2006

Debnica Kaszubska
Słupsk County